The Macleay Valley Way is a road in the Mid North Coast region of New South Wales that connects the Pacific Highway to  and . It runs along a former section of the Pacific Highway that was bypassed by a newer alignment between 2013 and 2016.

Route description
The Macleay Valley Way branches from the Pacific Highway at the Kempsey South Service Centre. It follows the former Pacific Highway alignment. Instead of bypassing population centres, the Macleay Valley Way passes through the towns of Kempsey and Frederickton.

History
Macleay Valley Way became the secondary road in two stages, as the new Pacific Highway was opened in two stages. The southern part of the new road is east of the old road which is now Macleay Valley Way through Kempsey. The northern part is west of the Macleay Valley Way. The new bridge over the Macleay River and bypass of Kempsey and Frederickton was opened first, on 27 March 2013.

The section north of Frederickton opened on 16 May 2016.

This northern section of Macleay Valley Way includes the part of the former Pacific Highway that was the site of the Kempsey bus crash which occurred in the locality of Clybucca in 1989 when two loaded tour buses collided head-on.

Major junction list

See also
Big River Way - bypassed section of Pacific Highway and the site of the Grafton bus crash
Giinagay Way - bypassed section of Pacific Highway at Nambucca Heads and Urunga

References

Roads in New South Wales